Hungarian Slovak Gypsies can refer to:
 Hungarian Slovak Gypsies in the United States
 Romani people in Hungary
 Romani people in Slovakia